Before & After is the fourth studio album by New Zealand singer/songwriter Tim Finn, released in July 1993.

Reception
Rolling Stone Australia claimed the album was "Tim Finn's best work in a recording career spanning almost twenty years. Finn has simplified his song-writing, finally dumping the clever-clever curlicues that have blurred his past work." The reviewer did note that production was, "sweet and shiny, to please radio programmers."

Track listing

Personnel

 Tim Finn - vocals on all tracks, acoustic guitar on 4–6, jupiter on 2, keyboards on 5, 7 & 12, piano on 5 &7, b-minor bar chord on 4, additional percussion on 7
 Neil Finn - vocals, guitar, keyboards {all on 3 & 9}
 Andy White - vocals, electric guitar & 12-string acoustic guitar on 5
 Liam Ó Maonlaí - vocals on 5 & 9
 Hothouse Flowers - band tracks on 3, 5 & 9, band tracks engineered by Pat McCarthy
 Steve Lewison - bass on 1, 7, 10 & 11
 Michael den Elzen - electric guitar on 1, 7 & 10–12, bass on 2, 8 & 12
 Steve Dudas - electric guitar on 4, 6 & 12
 Cliff Hugo - bass on 4 & 6
 Peter O'Toole - bass & bouzouki on 5
 Davy Spillane - Uilleann Pipes on 5
 Pete Lewinson - drums on 1, 7, 10 & 11
 Ricky Fataar - drums on 2 & 12
 Tom Walsh - drums on 6, percussion on 8
 Nicky Bomba - drums on 8, backing vocals on 8
 Thomas Dyani - percussion on 1, 7, 10 & 11
 Noel Eccles - percussion on 2 & 5
 Geoffrey Hales - percussion on 3, 8 & 9
 Steve Nieve - keyboards on 1, 7, 10 & 11
 Maurice Roycroft - keyboards on 2
 Eddie Rayner - keyboards on 3 & 9
 Mark Hart - keyboards on 4, 6 & 8, mandolin on 4, electric guitar on 6 & 8, vocals on 4, 6 & 8
 Dror Erez - piano, piano accordion {both on 8}
 Matthew Taylor - violin on 8
 Chris Ballin - backing vocals on 1 & 10
 Claudia Fontaine - backing vocals on 1, 7 & 10
 Tina Copa - backing vocals on 8
 Tony Copa - backing vocals on 8
 Bette Bright - spoken voice on 11

Charts

Notes 

Tim Finn albums
1993 albums
Capitol Records albums